Seize The Time: The Story of The Black Panther Party and Huey P. Newton is a 1970 book by political activist Bobby Seale. It was recorded in San Francisco County Jail between November 1969 and March 1970, by Arthur Goldberg, a reporter for the San Francisco Bay Guardian.  An advocacy book on the cause and principles of the Black Panther Party, Seize The Time is considered a staple in Black Power literature.

Seize the Time is a first-person narrative written from the perspective of Bobby Seale who recounts the story of the Black Panthers through conversational style prose. Reissued by Black Classic Press in 1991, the book begins with an introduction written by Seale wherein he provides an overview of the Black Panther Party, as well as calls for people to become activists in the fight for equality.

Synopsis
The book itself is arranged in seven chronological chapters, beginning with "Growing Up: Before the Party", which includes an introduction to Bobby Seale, his initial relationship with Huey Newton, and the antecedent behind starting the Black Panther Party.

The second chapter, titled "Huey: Getting the Party Going", provides the philosophical and ideological underpinnings of party, including reference to Quotations from Chairman Mao Tse-tung, which is commonly referred to as "The Little Red Book," as well as Fanon’s The Wretched of the Earth, which Seale introduced to Huey Newton.

The third chapter, titled "The Party Grows, Eldridge Joins", chronicles the expansion of the party and the positive effect of having Eldridge Cleaver, who was a writer for Ramparts magazine, join the movement.

The fourth chapter, "Picking Up the Gun", provides an account of the arrest of Seale and other Panthers while they were attempting to speak out at the state capitol in Sacramento on May 2, 1967, against the government creating what the Black Panthers believed to be racist legislation.

The fifth chapter titled "The Shit Comes Down: Free Huey", documents the arrest of Huey Newton and subsequent conviction for second-degree murder, as well as events surrounding the Free Huey party (also referred to as Huey's birthday rally), which was a barbeque picnic rally for the Huey P. Newton Defense Fund along with a campaign fundraiser for Newton (who was running on the ticket for Congress from the Seventh Congressional District) and Seale (who was running for the State Assembly for the Seventeenth District) wherein a coalition was formed between the Black Panther Party and Stokely Carmichael, as well as other members of the Student Nonviolent Coordinating Committee. This chapter also accounts the events that occurred subsequent to the assassination of Martin Luther King Jr., including the shooting of Bobby Hutton and arrest of Cleaver.

The sixth chapter, titled "Chicago: Kidnapped, Chained, Tired, and Gagged", chronicles the events surrounding Seale being kidnapped by federal agents and transported to Chicago, where he is on trial in connection with the New Haven Black Panther trials.

The book's final chapter, "Pigs, Problems, Politics, and Panthers", focuses on Seale’s beliefs regarding the underlying reasons for the Black Panther Raids, including Eldridge Cleaver's negotiations with North Vietnam and the CIA-FBI Infiltration known as COINTELPRO. This chapter also outlines the rules for members of  Black Panther Party' including their fight to end male chauvinism, and an overview of the Party's revolutionary community programs, such as Free Breakfast for Children, Liberation Schools, Legal Aid, Free Medical Care, and a Free Clothing Program. The book ends with a final essay regarding the importance of "seizing the time" in the fight for revolutionary change.

See also
 The Wretched of the Earth
 Soul on Ice
 The Autobiography of Malcolm X
 Mao's Little Red Book Quotations from Chairman Mao Tse-tung

References

External links
 Seize The Time via the Internet Archive

1970 non-fiction books
Black Power
Autobiographies
Prison writings